Damascus Eyalet was an eyalet of the Ottoman Empire. It became an eyalet after the Ottomans took it from the Mamluks following the 1516–1517 Ottoman–Mamluk War. Janbirdi al-Ghazali, a Mamluk traitor, was made the first beylerbey of Damascus. The Damascus Eyalet was one of the first Ottoman provinces to become a vilayet after an administrative reform in 1865, and by 1867 it had been reformed into the Syria Vilayet.

Territorial jurisdiction
The Ottoman Empire conquered Syria from the Mamluks following the Battle of Marj Dabiq in August 1516 and the subsequent pledges of allegiance paid to the Ottoman sultan, Selim I, in Damascus by delegations of notables from throughout Syria. The Ottomans established Damascus as the center of an eyalet (Ottoman province) whose territories consisted of the mamlakat (Mamluk provinces) of Damascus, Hama, Tripoli, Safad and Karak. The mamlaka of Aleppo, which covered much of northern Syria, became the Aleppo Eyalet. For a few months in 1521, Tripoli and its district were separated from Damascus Eyalet, but after 1579, the Tripoli Eyalet permanently became its own province.

At the close of the 16th century, the Damascus Eyalet was administratively divided into the sanjaks (districts) of Tadmur, Safad, Lajjun, Ajlun, Nablus, Jerusalem, Gaza and Karak, in addition to the city of Damascus and its district. There was also the sanjak of Sidon-Beirut, though throughout the late 16th century, it frequently switched hands between the eyalets of Damascus and Tripoli. Briefly in 1614, and then permanently after 1660, the Sidon-Beirut and Safad sanjaks were separated from Damascus to form the Sidon Eyalet. These administrative divisions largely held place with relatively minor changes until the mid-19th century.

Governors

 Janbirdi al-Ghazali (1518–1521)
 Ahmad ibn Ridwan (1601–1607)
 Sulayman Pasha al-Azm (1733–1737; 1741–1743)
 As'ad Pasha al-Azm (1743–1757)
 Uthman Pasha al-Kurji (1760-1771)
 Abdullah Pasha al-Azm (1795-1798; 1799-1803; 1804–1807)
 Mehmed Emin Rauf Pasha (October 1828 - July 1831)
 Mehmed Selim Pasha (1830–1831)

Administrative divisions

Sanjaks of Damascus Eyalet in the 17th century:
Khass sanjaks (i.e. yielded a land revenue):
 Sanjak of Damascus
 Sanjak of Jerusalem
 Sanjak of Gaza
 Sanjak of Karak
 Sanjak of Safad
 Sanjak of Nablus
 Sanjak of Ajlun
 Sanjak of Lajjun
 Sanjak of Beqaa

Salyane sanjaks (i.e. had an annual allowance from government):
 Sanjak of Tadmur
 Sanjak of Sidon
 Sanjak of Beirut

See also 
Ottoman Syria

References

Bibliography

Ottoman Syria
Eyalets of the Ottoman Empire in Asia
History of Damascus
Political entities in the Land of Israel
1510s in Ottoman Syria
16th century in Ottoman Syria
17th century in Ottoman Syria
18th century in Ottoman Syria
19th century in Ottoman Syria
1510s establishments in Asia
16th-century establishments in Ottoman Syria
1864 disestablishments in Ottoman Syria
1860s disestablishments in Asia
1516 establishments in the Ottoman Empire